Sint-Eloois-Winkel is a village in the Belgian province of West Flanders. It is a deelgemeente of the municipality of Ledegem, separated from the center of the town by highway A17. The population of Sint-Eloois-Winkel is 3800, only a few hundred less than that of central Ledegem.

History
In the 18th century Sint-Eloois-Winkel was divided by the almost as three times bigger neighbor town, Gullegem, only to get back its dependence after a few years of separation from Ledegem, since there is no own mail, library and city hall.

Sport
 Sint-Eloois-Winkel is well known for its annual horse races in October.
 The Sint-Eloois-Winkel Sport football club belongs to the Royal Belgian Football Association and plays in the national Belgian First Amateur Division.

References

Populated places in West Flanders